Driving Force may refer to:

Arts and entertainment
 Driving Force (1921 film), a 1921 German silent film
 Driving Force (1989 film), a 1989 action film
 Driving Force (TV series), an American reality television program 
 Driving Force, a 2005 album by 3rd Force
 Driving Force, a 1984 arcade video game by Shinkai

Other uses
 Logitech Driving Force GT, a model of steering wheel

See also
 Force, in physics
 Reversal potential, in a biological membrane